The United States District Court for the District of New Hampshire (in case citations, D.N.H.)  is the federal district court whose jurisdiction comprises the state of New Hampshire.  The Warren B. Rudman U.S. Courthouse for the New Hampshire district is located in Concord.

Appeals from the District of New Hampshire are taken to the United States Court of Appeals for the First Circuit (except for patent claims and claims against the U.S. government under the Tucker Act, which are appealed to the Federal Circuit).

The United States Attorney's Office for the District of New Hampshire represents the United States in civil and criminal litigation in the court. , the United States Attorney is Jane E. Young.

Current judges
:

Former judges

Chief judges

Succession of seats

U.S. Attorneys

See also
 Courts of New Hampshire
 List of current United States district judges
 List of United States federal courthouses in New Hampshire

References

External links
 United States District Court for the District of New Hampshire
 United States Attorney for the District of New Hampshire
 United States Probation and Pretrial Services of New Hampshire

New Hampshire
New Hampshire law
Concord, New Hampshire
1789 establishments in New Hampshire
Courthouses in New Hampshire
Courts and tribunals established in 1789